The  (Spandau school of church music) was a music academy in Spandau, Berlin, Germany. The schools choir appeared and recorded as the Spandauer Kantorei. It was located in today's Berlin-Hakenfelde, and is also known as Berliner Kirchenmusikschule.

Notable teachers included composers Hugo Distler, Ernst Pepping, Winfried Radeke and Heinz Werner Zimmermann, his wife Renate Zimmermann, the organists Heinz Lohmann and Karl Hochreither, and the conductor Helmuth Rilling (until 1966).

The school was suggested for university status in 1990 because of its excellent reputation, but instead it was dissolved in 1998 and became part of the Musikhochschule Berlin.

Directors 
 1929–1935 Gerhard Schwarz
 1935–1955 Gottfried Grote
 1955–1963 Hanns-Martin Schneidt
 1963–1976 Heinz Werner Zimmermann
 1976–1998 Martin Behrmann

References

External links 
 Spandauer Kantorei discogs.com
 Gustav A. Krieg: Die gottesdienstliche Musik als theologisches Problem: dargestellt an der kirchenmusikalischen Erneuerung nach dem ersten Weltkrieg, Vandenhoeck & Ruprecht 1990

German church music
Music schools in Germany
Christian schools in Germany
Buildings and structures in Spandau
Educational institutions disestablished in 1998